The Quaker Manor House is a historic building located at 1165 Pinetown Road in Fort Washington, Pennsylvania, in the United States.

It was built in 1730 as a residence and fur trading post by John Getty,  who served as an Indian agent representing the Province of Pennsylvania and Governor Patrick Gordon, and a friend of James Logan.  After Getty's death, the house was purchased by Quaker Jeremiah Warder, a Philadelphia merchant, who lived in the house until 1783.  Warder, who was a friend of Benjamin Chew, was arrested during the American Revolution and imprisoned in Virginia.  During this period, the Quaker Manor House was also known by the name "Warder's Conquest."

During the American Revolutionary War, George Washington and the Continental Army spent six weeks camped at nearby Whitemarsh in the autumn of 1777. During the encampment, the Quaker Manor House served as the headquarters for Washington's Surgeon General, John Cochran.

The Quaker Manor House is listed on the U.S. National Register of Historic Places, and is currently a privately owned residence.

References

Houses on the National Register of Historic Places in Pennsylvania
Upper Dublin Township, Montgomery County, Pennsylvania
American Revolutionary War sites
Houses in Montgomery County, Pennsylvania
National Register of Historic Places in Montgomery County, Pennsylvania